The 2020–21 Iranian Futsal Super League is the 22nd season of the Iran Pro League and the 17th under the name Futsal Super League. Mes Sungun are the defending champions. The season will feature 12 teams from the 2019–20 Super League and two new teams promoted from the 2019–20 Iran Futsal's 1st Division.

Format changes 
Final match of last season and the beginning of this season has some postponements due to COVID-19 pandemic in Iran. And other international futsal games have the same issues too. Therefore, this season has to be held squeezed and these changes has been made:

Regular season 
14 teams will be divided to 2 groups of 7 teams each. Each Groups matches will be held in two regions (with two hosts) in a round-robin format. After the end of regular season, teams will be divided to 3 parts by their rankings:

 Teams ranked 1st, 2nd and 3rd in each group (total 6 teams) will qualify for the Championship playoffs.
 Teams ranked 4th and 5th in each group (total 4 teams) will remain in next season's super league.
 Teams ranked 6th and 7th in each group (total 4 teams) will play in Relegation playoffs.

Playoffs 
Championship playoffs will be held in round-robin format with 6 teams in 10 weeks. Final ranking of this round will define the champion.
Relegation playoffs will be held in round-robin format with 4 teams in 6 weeks. Teams ranked 3rd and 4th in this round will relegate to next season's 1st division.

Teams

Stadiums and locations

Personnel

Number of teams by region

Regular season

Group A 
</noinclude> Group B  Playoffs 
 Championship Playoffs  Relegation Playoffs <noinclude>

Awards 

 Winner: Mes Sungun
 Runners-up: Giti Pasand
 Third-Place: Sunich
 Top scorer: Saeid Ahmadabbasi (Giti Pasand) (26 goals) 
 Best Player: 
 Best Manager: 
 Best Goalkeeper: 
 Best Team: 
 Fairplay Man: 
 Best Referee:

References

External links 
 Iran Futsal League on PersianLeague 
 Futsal Planet 

Iranian Futsal Super League seasons
1